Pollicipedidae is a family of goose barnacles.

Genera
These genera belong to the family Pollicipedidae:
 Anelasma Darwin, 1852
 Capitulum Gray, 1825
 Pollicipes Leach, 1817

References

External links

 
Barnacles
Crustacean families